Spencer Platt (born 24 August 1974) is a former English cricketer. Platt was a left-handed batsman who played primarily as a wicketkeeper. He was born at Coventry, Warwickshire.

Platt represented the Warwickshire Cricket Board in List A cricket. His debut List A match came against Berkshire in the 1999 NatWest Trophy. From 1999 to 2001, he represented the Board in 5 matches, the last of which came against Cambridgeshire in the 2nd round of the 2002 Cheltenham & Gloucester Trophy, which was held in 2001. In his 5 List A matches, he scored 65 runs at a batting average of 13.00, with a high score of 22. Behind the stumps he took a single catch and made 3 stumpings.

References

External links
Spencer Platt at Cricinfo
Spencer Platt at CricketArchive

1974 births
Living people
Cricketers from Coventry
People from Warwickshire
English cricketers
Warwickshire Cricket Board cricketers